Daniel Radu (born 10 September 1957) is a Romanian judoka. He competed in the men's half-heavyweight event at the 1980 Summer Olympics.

References

1957 births
Living people
Romanian male judoka
Olympic judoka of Romania
Judoka at the 1980 Summer Olympics
Place of birth missing (living people)